Oxoia is a genus of moths in the family Notodontidae described by Sergius G. Kiriakoff in 1967. Three species are known.

Characteristics
The genus is characterized by elongated green forewings. There are diagnostic black streaks in the postmedian and the basal area of the forewings. Both sexes are similar.

Distribution and habitat
The genus ranges from the Himalayas, Indochina, Yunnan and Sundaland throughout the oriental islands
until New Guinea

Species
 Oxoia antonia Druce, 1901
 Oxoia irrorativiridis Bethune-Baker, 1904
 Oxoia smaragdiplena Walker 1862

References

External links

Notodontidae